Qaleh-ye Mir Ali (also Romanized as Qal‘eh-ye Mīr Ālī and Qal‘eh-ye Mīr‘Alī) is a village in Gerit Rural District, Papi District, Khorramabad County, Lorestan Province, Iran. At the 2006 census, its population was 32, in 8 families.

References 

Towns and villages in Khorramabad County